Kosovo–Netherlands relations are foreign relations between Kosovo and the Netherlands. Kosovo declared its independence on 17 February 2008 and the Netherlands recognised it on 4 March 2008. The Netherlands have maintained an embassy in Pristina since 27 June 2008, and Kosovo opened an embassy in The Hague in November 2009. Relations between the two countries are considered to be good and the Netherlands offers support to various projects in Kosovo with the goal of aiding the country in its transition to democracy.

Military
The Netherlands participated in the 1999 NATO bombing of Yugoslavia, which resulted in a UN administration of Kosovo and then to eventual independence. The Netherlands currently has 7 troops serving in Kosovo as peacekeepers in the NATO led Kosovo Force. Originally there were 3,600 Dutch troops in KFOR.

Economics
Economic cooperation between Kosovo and the Netherlands is limited although there are several areas for cooperation between the two countries in the energy and agricultural sectors.

Development
Outside of the EU framework, the Netherlands uses the Matra Programme, of which Kosovo is a beneficiary, to organise projects in countries in Central and Eastern Europe to aide them in their transition to democracy and rule of law. In the case of Kosovo, the Dutch Embassy uses this programme to encourage cooperation between the Serbian and Albanian communities in the North of Kosovo.

See also
 Foreign relations of Kosovo
 Foreign relations of the Netherlands
 Netherlands–Serbia relations

Notes and references
Notes:

References:

 
Netherlands